A Heyting field is one of the inequivalent ways in constructive mathematics to capture the classical notion of a field. It is essentially a field with an apartness relation. The first two conditions say that the ring is local; the first and third conditions say that it is a field in the classical sense.

The apartness relation is defined by writing  #  if  is invertible.

The prototypical Heyting field is the real numbers.

References
 Mines, Richman, Ruitenberg. A Course in Constructive Algebra. Springer, 1987.

Constructivism (mathematics)